Statistics of UAE Football League in season 1981/82.

Overview
Al Wasl FC won the championship. They were captained by Danish international Peter Engelsen, 17.

References
United Arab Emirates - List of final tables (RSSSF)

UAE Pro League seasons
United
1981–82 in Emirati football